The canton of Cébazat is an administrative division of the Puy-de-Dôme department, central France. It was created at the French canton reorganisation which came into effect in March 2015. Its seat is in Cébazat.

It consists of the following communes:
Blanzat
Cébazat
Durtol
Nohanent
Sayat

References

Cantons of Puy-de-Dôme